Nirakkoottu is a 1985 Indian Malayalam-language film directed by Joshiy, written by Dennis Joseph, starring Mammootty, Sumalatha, Urvashi, Lizy, Babu Namboothiri and Jose Prakash. The music was composed by Shyam. The story follows journalist Sasikala Varghese's (Urvashi) investigation of millionaire Ravi Varma (Mammootty), who is sentenced to death for the murder of his wife Mercy (Sumalatha).

Plot
Sasikala Varghese gets a job as a news reporter in a Malayalam daily named "Keralarema", which is owned by M. K. Abraham. Sasikala stays with her friend, Dr. Suma. She is assigned to interview Ravi Varma, a millionaire who is sentenced to death for the murder of his wife Mercy, who was also Sasikala's sister. The Supreme Court has sentenced Ravi to death, and the president has rejected Ravi's appeal. Sasikala covers and publishes the story of Ravi Varma and is praised by Abraham, her boss, during the official meeting. They were then surprised by a feedback letter that had reached the Keralarema office regarding the published article. 

The film then transitions into a flashback following Ravi Varma, the accused man. Ravi is a wealthy man and the owner of an advertising agency. Mercy is employed as a clerk in a firm and is also a classical dancer. Ravi had met Mercy during a dance program hosted at a club. He had then proposed an offer to Mercy for her to join his advertising agency as a model, which Mercy immediately rejects. However, upon losing her job as a clerk and with her family (consisting of an ill father, a younger sister and brother) already dependent on her income, she is forced to join Ravi's advertising agency. The advertising agency flourishes well with the utilization of Mercy's modeling skills. A career-oriented Ravi, in order to make Mercy stay with his firm permanently, proposes to Mercy and they get registry-married, as they belong to different religions. After a week-long honeymoon, Ravi forces his wife to pose for modeling with a half-dressed costume, despite her protests. This leads to conflict in their family life. Once Ravi learns that his wife is pregnant, an argument begins again regarding the fatherhood of the conceived child, and Ravi asks his wife to move out of his house. Mercy then takes shelter with her friend, Dr. Suma. Ravi files for divorce, and it is granted with the verdict that Ravi needs to compensate his wife and child on a monthly basis until the child becomes a youth. A drunken Ravi visits Mercy and tells her that instead of paying the compensation monthly, he would pay her all the money at once. Ravi then pulls a knife and murders Mercy. 

A day before his scheduled execution, Ravi Varma escapes prison, and accidentally meets Sasikala. He learns that Sasikala and Mercy are sisters and tells her the truth about what really happened. Ravi loved Mercy and never pressured her for any modeling assignments. Ajith had blackmailed Mercy by threatening to expose nude images of her to the world. Fearing social stigma, Mercy divorces Ravi unwillingly. Ajith later tries to molest Mercy, kills her and flees. Since Ravi was at the scene of the murder, he was taken into custody by the police. To avenge his wife, Ravi escapes from the prison and then kills Ajith.

Cast
 Mammootty as Ravi Varma
 Sumalatha as Mercy
 Urvashi as Sasikala Varghese
 Lissy as Dr. Suma
 Babu Namboothiri as Ajith
 Azeez as Jailor
 Jose Prakash as M. K. Abraham 
 Baiju as Boy at the petrol bunk
 Prathapachandran as Paul Mathew
 Thodupuzha Vasanthi as co-worker of Sasikala

Release
The film was released on 12 September 1985.

Box office
The film was both commercial and critical success.

Soundtrack
The music was composed by Shyam and the lyrics were written by Poovachal Khader. K. S. Chithra won her first Kerala State Film Award for Best Singer for the song Poomaname.

Awards
Mammootty won the Kerala State Film Award – Special Jury Award in 1985 Kerala State Film Awards for his role as Ravi Varma. K. S. Chithra won the Kerala State Film Awards in 1985 Best Play Back Singer for the song "Poomaname"

Filmfare Award for Best Film -  Malayalam - Joy Thomas (1985)

References

External links 
 

1985 films
1980s Malayalam-language films
Malayalam films remade in other languages
Films scored by Shyam (composer)
Films directed by Joshiy
Indian thriller films
Films with screenplays by Dennis Joseph
1985 thriller films